Granchi's leaf-toed gecko (Hemidactylus granchii)  is a species of gecko, a lizard in the family Gekkonidae. The species is endemic to east central Somalia.

Etymology
The specific name, granchii, is in honor of Italian herpetologist Edoardo Granchi of the Museo di Storia Naturale di Firenze.

References

Further reading
Lanza B (1978). "On some new or interesting East African amphibians and reptiles". Monitore Zoologico Italiano, Supplemento 10 (14): 229–297. (Hemidactylus granchii, new species, p. 255).
Šmíd, Jiří; Mazuch, Tomáš; Sindaco, Roberto (2014). "An additional record of the little known gecko Hemidactylus granchii Lanza, 1978 (Reptilia: Gekkonidae) from Somalia". pp. 165–169. In: Capula, Massimo; Corti, Claudia (editors) (2014). Scripta Herpetologica. Studies on Amphibians and Reptiles in honour of Benedetto Lanza. Latina, Italy: Edizioni Belvedere. 200 pp.

Hemidactylus
Geckos of Africa
Reptiles of Somalia
Endemic fauna of Somalia
Reptiles described in 1978
Taxa named by Benedetto Lanza